Lino Edgardo Schramm Cayetano (born January 4, 1978) is a Filipino politician and television director who served as the Mayor of Taguig from 2019 to 2022. He previously served as the representative of the 2nd district of Taguig from 2013 to 2016, and was the Barangay Chairman of Fort Bonifacio from 2010 to 2013. Before entering politics, he was a television director for several shows on ABS-CBN.

Cayetano was born to a political family currently based in Taguig. His father was the late former senator Rene Cayetano; his older sister, Pia, is an incumbent senator; his older brother, Alan Peter, is also an incumbent senator who formerly served as the representative of Taguig–Pateros; and Alan Peter's wife, Lani, is the incumbent mayor of Taguig.

Personal life
Cayetano is currently married to former Ateneo Lady Eagles volleyball player Fille Cainglet, who is 12 years younger than him. Cayetano and Cainglet, first met each other in an all-star volleyball tourney in summer of 2013.

The couple got married on December 27, 2013, in Mactan, Cebu. He and Cainglet had a two-year-old boy named Ino Philip.

On August 8, 2016, the couple welcomed their second child, a daughter named Fille Renee. On March 3, 2018, they became a family of five welcoming their third child, Lily Saint.  In the past years, Cayetano was involved in different relationships with Kris Aquino, Shaina Magdayao, KC Concepcion, and Bianca Gonzales.

Lino is also known as a "father's boy", where he donated a one-third of liver to his ailing father, former Senator Rene Cayetano, who later died due to complications of his liver cancer in June 2003. He is also a player for the UP men's volleyball team.

Career

Entertainment
He took up a mass communication degree in the University of the Philippines Diliman as a varsity scholar in 1999, he also finished a film degree in the New York University on the same year. Cayetano started his directorial work in 2003 for the first season of GMA's talent reality show StarStruck. In May 2004, he directed an episode of Maalaala Mo Kaya that featured the biography of his own father, entitled Upuan.

Cayetano then collaborated with Maryo J. de los Reyes to direct two television dramas in ABS-CBN, Mga Anghel na Walang Langit and Calla Lily. He also directed the  singing competition series, Little Big Star. Among other notable projects that he directed for ABS-CBN are the television series Aryana, Noah, Tanging Yaman, Kung Ako'y Iiwan Mo, Growing Up, and several episodes of the anthology series Ipaglaban Mo! and Maalaala Mo Kaya. 

Cayetano returned to directing in 2016 as one of the directors of ABS-CBN's primetime drama series My Super D, together with Frasco Mortiz, after a 3-year break.

Politics
In 2010, Cayetano finally decided to enter into politics as a barangay captain of Fort Bonifacio. He was later elected as the Congressman of Taguig's 2nd District in 2013 at the age of 36, and under the Nacionalista Party. In his first days in office, Cayetano filed the "Iskolar ng Bayan" bill, that first implemented in the city. In the bill, all graduates and Top 10 of their classes from high schools are automatically become scholars in state-owned universities including the University of the Philippines.

Three years later, he filed the certificate of candidacy to seek a reelection as Congressman, but he decided to withdraw it to give way to his sister Pia as his replacement.

In 2019, he successfully ran for Mayor of Taguig, succeeding his sister-in-law Lani Cayetano. He served for only one term as mayor and stepped down in 2022.

References

External links

1978 births
Living people
Lino
Filipino television directors
Members of the House of Representatives of the Philippines from Taguig
Nacionalista Party politicians
Sportspeople from Metro Manila
University Athletic Association of the Philippines volleyball players
University of the Philippines Diliman alumni
Filipino people of German descent
Filipino people of American descent
ABS-CBN people
Filipino men's volleyball players
Mayors of Taguig